A battleground is the site of a battle. Battle Ground or battleground may also refer to:

Arts, entertainment, and media

Films
 Battleground (film), a 1949 war film about the Battle of the Bulge
 BattleGround: 21 Days on the Empire's Edge (2004), a documentary about the Iraq War
 Forbidden Ground (2013 film), known as Battle Ground in the United States, an Australian action drama war film set in WWI

Games
 Battleground (video game series) by TalonSoft
 Battleground: Bulge-Ardennes, the first game in the series
 Battleground – Crossbows and Catapults, a tabletop war game better known by its previous name, Crossbows and Catapults
 Magic: The Gathering – Battlegrounds, a 2003 strategy video game
 PUBG: Battlegrounds, a massively multiplayer online survival shooter previously known as PlayerUnknown's Battlegrounds
 Star Wars: Galactic Battlegrounds, a 2001 strategy game
 World War II Online: Battleground Europe, a massively multi-player online first-person shooter computer game

Literature
 "Battleground" (short story), a 1972 Stephen King short story which appears in Night Shift
 Battleground, the fourth book in The Corps Series by W.E.B. Griffin
 Battleground, the sixth book in the Code Red series by Chris Ryan
 Battleground: Fact and Fantasy in Palestine, a 1973 history book concerning the Arab-Israeli conflict
 Battle Ground (The Dresden Files), a 2020 novel by Jim Butcher

Music
 Battleground (album), a 2011 album by The Wanted

Television
 Battleground (2014), a professional wrestling pay-per-view (PPV) event
 Battleground (TV series), a 2012 documentary-style drama series about a political campaign
 Battleground, a Pentagon Channel original series featuring historic films from World War II, the Korean War, the Vietnam War and more
 "Battleground", an episode of the 2006 TNT show Nightmares & Dreamscapes: From the Stories of Stephen King based on Stephen King's 1972 short story  
 WWE Battleground, a WWE PPV show

Places 
 Battle Ground, Indiana
 Battle Ground, Washington
 Battleground, Alabama

See also
 Battle (disambiguation)
 BattleBots
 Battlefield (disambiguation)
 Battlespace